Gunter Prus was  Bishop of Płock in 1223 and again from 1227 to 1232. Born into the Prus noble family, he was Canon and Dean of Płock. Following the death of Bishop Gedko Powało, he contended – supported by Duke Konrad I of Masovia – for the bishop's throne against his rival Jan Gozdawita who died in 1227. His episcopacy saw him oppose the Teutonic Knights encourage Duke Konrad, recall the Teutonic Knights to Polish lands and militarily oppose the neighbouring, pagan Old Prussians who were pillaging and slaving in Polish territory at the time. He died in 1232 in Vienna on a diplomatic mission, and he was buried in Rome.

References

Bishops of Płock
Year of birth unknown
12th-century births
1232 deaths
13th-century Roman Catholic bishops in Poland